Pinnotheres atrinicola is a small crab that lives symbiotically in the horse mussel Atrina zelandica around New Zealand. This species was recognised as being distinct from Pinnotheres novaezelandiae in 1983.

References

External links
 Holotype
 
 

Marine crustaceans of New Zealand
Pinnotheroidea
Crustaceans described in 1983